Güzlək or Küzlək may refer to:
Aşağı Güzlək, Azerbaijan
Yuxarı Güzlək, Azerbaijan